Christopher "Hawkeye" Collins and Amy (Amanda) Adams are a pair of 12-year-old fictional detectives, the main characters in a series of children's novels titled Can You Solve The Mystery?, credited to M. Masters (a pseudonym used by different writers), originally published from 1983–1985, by Meadowbrook Press.  The series was republished in 1992, 2006-2007 by Spotlight (ABDO Publishing Company) and most recently in 2013 by Meadowbrook Press as Can You Solve The Mystery?.

Style
Similar in style to Encyclopedia Brown, readers are given clues in the form of narration.  An important distinction from the Encyclopedia Brown series is the graphical picture included for each story, presented as a sketch by "Hawkeye" Collins of the scene of the crime, which provide the necessary hint to solve the puzzle.

Collins and Adams are neighbours who live across from each other on Crestview Drive in the fictional town of Lakewood Hills, Minnesota.  Collins is described as having excellent observation prowess and able to carry out a quick but comprehensive sketch of the scene of the crime which capture vital clues to solving the mystery.  Adams is an athletic red-haired girl who is described as "quick of mind, quick of feet and quick of temper".

It was mentioned that Hawkeye's father is a lawyer and his mother a real-estate agent.  Amy's father is an airline pilot and her mother a medical doctor.

Together, they were often called upon to solve crimes or mysteries in their town.

Book Structure
As an introduction to the main characters, after the content page of all books in the series, readers will find a double-page impression of a fictional newspaper Lakewood Hills Herald cutouts with two photos of Hawkeye and Amy, and beneath them the headline "Young Sleuths Detect Fun in Mysteries", by staff writer named Alice Cory.  The articles were shown to be from page 2A and 4A of the publication, dated Thursday, March 17, 1983.

The article narrated the backgrounds of Hawkeye and Amy, specifying they were 12 years old attending sixth grade in Lakewood Hills Elementary.  Hawkeye's father was named as attorney Peter Collins, and his mother real-estate agent Linda Collins.

The story went on to report Hawkeye and Amy started in the detective business the year before, solving a crime in their own school, and impressing police sergeant Treadwell.

The next page showed a letter from Hawkeye and Amy inviting readers to solve the mysteries in the book by reading carefully, and then to look closely at the picture provided.

The solutions to the mysteries are found at the end of the book, printed in mirror image.

While most of the books in the series are self-contained and composed of mini-mysteries, several of the books contained different portions of the same case.  In the first book, the last mystery was part 1 of a 2 part mystery, with the solution, and part 2 of the Mystery, published in the second book.

Recurring characters
Recurring characters in the books include:

Mrs. von Buttermore - The richest person in Lakewood Hills who come into contact with the detective pair either because of crimes involving her wealth, or her hobby of donating to charitable causes in town, including sponsoring children's activities.
Lucy Adams - Amy's six-year-old sister who has a love-hate relationship with Amy.
Sergeant Treadwell - Veteran of Lakewood Hills Police Department, he is described as a good police officer but poor detective.  He is also fond of snacking, despite being told to go on a diet several times by his doctor, Amy's mother.
Mrs. Ratchet - a grumpy woman who hated any form of intrusion to her residence.  Unfortunately, her house is across the park and has been the deliberate or unwitting target of numerous trespasses, and the cause of a number of puzzles for Hawkeye and Amy.
 Nosey - Hawkeye's female golden retriever.

Places/Organizations
 Bytes of Data Computer Club - The computer club of Lakewood Hills Elementary, which both Hawkeye and Amy were members of.

Books in the series

Comic strip
There was both a daily and Sunday comic strip version of "Can You Solve The Mystery?" that ran in newspapers from August 5, 1984 to December 29, 1985. The comic strip was written initially by Jim Lawrence and drawn by Fran Matera, but others took on later in the run of the series.

References

There are more information and examples of the daily strips here- 
http://strippersguide.blogspot.com/2010/02/obscurity-of-day-can-you-solve-mystery.html
and examples of the Sunday strip here in a link posted on the comments portion of that blog.

External links

 Meadowbrook Press - Can You Solve The Mystery?
 ABDO Publishing Company - Hawkeye Collins and Amy Adams

Fictional amateur detectives
Child characters in literature
Series of children's books
Works published under a pseudonym
Children's mystery novels
Literary duos